The Lester River Fish Hatchery was a federal fish hatchery in Duluth, Minnesota, United States.  It was built at the mouth of the Lester River in the 1880s to propagate fish for the Lake Superior commercial fishery.  The hatchery closed in 1946 and the facility was sold to the University of Minnesota Duluth, which used it as its Limnological Research Station.  The surviving four buildings are noted for their Stick and Shingle Style architecture, forming a distinctive landmark to local residents as well as tourists heading to Superior's North Shore.

In 1978 the hatchery complex was listed on the National Register of Historic Places under the name US Fisheries Station, Duluth, for its state-level significance in the themes of architecture and education.  It was nominated for exemplifying the Stick and Shingle styles popular in Minnesota during the 1880s and for its long association with studies conducted on Lake Superior.

See also
 National Register of Historic Places listings in St. Louis County, Minnesota

References

External links

1888 establishments in Minnesota
1946 disestablishments in Minnesota
Buildings and structures in Duluth, Minnesota
Fish hatcheries in the United States
Government buildings completed in 1888
Government buildings on the National Register of Historic Places in Minnesota
Lake Superior
National Register of Historic Places in St. Louis County, Minnesota
Shingle Style architecture in Minnesota
Stick-Eastlake architecture in Minnesota
University of Minnesota Duluth